Animato is a compilation of short films by Mike Jittlov, making extensive use of stop motion, pixilation,  kinestasis, animation, and multiple exposures. It features the films The Interview, Swing Shift, Rocketman, The Leap, Time Tripper and Fashionation.

It was screened at Filmex in 1977. Regis Philbin was so impressed by the short Time Tripper that he had it televised.

Fashionation is one of the well-known animated segments. The short was made using kinestasis and cutout animation, mostly from fashion magazines illustrating the lyrics of the song "I Know a Place" by Petula Clark. It also extensively used multiple exposures, pixilation and stop motion for the brief live-action sequence.

See also
 The Wizard of Speed and Time
 Mike Jittlov
 1977 in film

References

External links
 
 Animato on YouTube
 

American independent films
1970s stop-motion animated films
1977 films
Animated anthology films
1970s American animated films
American animated short films
Compilation films
Films directed by Mike Jittlov
1977 short films
1977 animated films